Mohra Nagrial is a town in the Islamabad Capital Territory of Pakistan. It is located at 33° 23' 45N 73° 29' 20E with an altitude of 489 metres (1607 feet). The village is named after the Nagrial tribe of Rajputs, who make up the majority of the population and heavy inbreeding is practiced in this village which has been known to produce a variety of genetic disorders as a result.

References 

Union councils of Islamabad Capital Territory
Villages in Islamabad Capital Territory